Großbreitenbach is a former Verwaltungsgemeinschaft ("collective municipality") in the district Ilm-Kreis, in Thuringia, Germany. The seat of the Verwaltungsgemeinschaft was in Großbreitenbach. It was disbanded in January 2019.

The Verwaltungsgemeinschaft Großbreitenbach consisted of the following municipalities:

Altenfeld
Böhlen
Friedersdorf 
Gillersdorf 
Großbreitenbach
Herschdorf 
Neustadt am Rennsteig 
Wildenspring

References

Former Verwaltungsgemeinschaften in Thuringia